Semarang–Solo Toll Road is a part of Trans-Java toll road that connects Semarang, capital city of Central Java and Surakarta (Solo) via Salatiga in Indonesia. This toll road is 75.7 kilometers length which is directly connected with  Semarang Toll Road in Tembalang Interchange.
It is operated by PT Trans Marga Jateng, a subsidiary of state-owned toll road developer and operator PT Jasa Marga (IDX:JSMR) Tbk.

Road Section
This toll road has been decided into 5 sections :

Bridges
This toll road has few long bridges, which cross over both the river and the valley :
Section 1 (TEMBALANG–UNGARAN)
 Banyumanik 1 (170 m)
 Banyumanik 2 (384 m)
 Gedawang (470 m)
 Susukan (470 m)
 Penggaron (400 m)
Section 2 (UNGARAN–BAWEN)
 Tinalun (335 m)
 Lemah Ireng I (879 m)
 Lemah Ireng II (300 m)
Section 3 (BAWEN-SALATIGA)
 Tuntang (330 m)
 Senjoyo (170 m)
Section 4 (SALATIGA-BOYOLALI)
 Kenteng and Serang Rivers (493 m)
 Cemoro River (200 m)
 Butak River (163 m)
 Cengger River 1 (337 m)
 Cengger River 2 (130 m)
 Pepe River (111 m)
 Bendo River (44 m)
 Kiringan River (37 m)
 Putih River 1 (122 m)
 Putih River 2 (73 m)
 Kali Putih Access Road (120 m)
Section 5 (BOYOLALI-KARTASURA)
 Grenjeng River (73 m)
 Putih River (81 m)
 Pleret River (42 m)
 Pepe River (89 m)

Exits

References

Toll roads in Indonesia
Transport in Central Java